This Business of Art is the second studio album by Canadian indie pop duo Tegan and Sara, released in 2000. It is their first official release through Vapor Records, though they independently released Under Feet Like Ours the previous year. Six of the songs originally appeared on its predecessor; "Proud", "Hype", "Freedom", "More for Me", "Come On" and "Superstar". "Frozen" was later included on the 2001 re-release of their debut album. This album was recorded at Hawksleytown Studios and mixed and mastered at Umbrella Sound in Toronto.

"My Number" was featured on the Sweet November soundtrack. In 2013, "Freedom" became the soundtrack to a Freederm advertising campaign in the UK.

Track listing

Personnel
 Tegan and Sara Quin – vocals, lyrics, music, guitars
 Hawksley Workman – drums, bass guitar, piano, guitar, keyboards, harmonica, producer
 Karl Mohr – drum programming, keyboards
 Joao Carvalho – mixing, mastering, additional recording
 Greg O'Shea – additional recording
 Greg Hall – album layout and design, photography
 Ivan Otis – photography

References

External links
 Album info at fansite

Tegan and Sara albums
2000 albums
Vapor Records albums